Effin is a townland and civil parish in County Limerick, Ireland. It is on the R515 road, midway between Kilmallock and Charleville. The population of the parish is about 1,000. Effin is partly in the barony of Costlea, but chiefly in that of Coshma. The parish lies in the heart of the Golden Vale, Munster's rich dairyland, and intensive dairying is practised there. Ballyhoura Mountains which separate County Limerick from County Cork, are at the southern end of the parish.

History

The town is named after Saint Eimhin, (see also Monasterevin in County Kildare) pronounced  . In the past, the local seats belonged to J. Balie, and R. Low Holmes. Balie lived in Newpark, and Holmes in Maidenhall.

There is a silver chalice still in use in Effin which bears the following inscription: Aegidius Hiffernane et Eleanora Gibbon et Cornelius Hiffernane Aegidii filius me fieri fecurunt 1633.

It has frequently been noted on lists of unusual place names. In November 2011, residents of Effin came into conflict with the Facebook website when they could not register the town as their home. "Effin" was deemed by Facebook to be "offensive"; the word "effing" is also a euphemism for "fucking", and was blocked. Effin residents led by local woman AnnMarie Kennedy campaigned against the block, and Facebook claimed to be investigating the matter. The following month, it was discovered that Facebook users could register Effin as their hometown.

In March 2012 a group called the Effin Eggheads raised over €52,420.96 for the Shave or Dye Cancer fund and became one of the highest charity fundraising group in the Today FM campaign.

Places of interest

Church
Father David Nagle built the present church of Effin in 1835-6 and on his death in 1847, he was buried there. The church was renovated in 1981. There is a statue of the crucifixion on the right-hand side, at the entrance to the church, donated by Michael Rea.

Canon Hayes Hall
There is a parish hall that was built by the people of the parish in the 1950s. It was built in memory of John, Canon Hayes, P.P., Founder of Muintir na Tíre, who was a native of Murroe in east Limerick who spent his final years as parish priest of Bansha & Kilmoyler which is in west County Tipperary and is a parish of the Diocese of Cashel and Emly. Canon Hayes was a champion of rural development, whose dictum was that the small communities of rural Ireland must help themselves in unison, regardless of class, creed or calling in life. He died on St Bridget's Day, 1 February 1957 during the building of the hall and fittingly, on its 50th anniversary a history of the hall was published.

Graveyard
According to Samuel Lewis, when Effin was united with the parish of Kilquane and Kilbreedy Minor, there were two small chapels in the parish; one at Effin, the other at Kilbreedy. Kilbreedy Minor church was badly ruined by the late 1830s. Only the middle and side walls of the choir remained.

Kilquane church was a brown sandstone church erected at the foot of Cahir Hill. By 1840, little remained of this ancient structure. Another church, Kilbigly church, had disappeared by 1840. The parish of Kilquane had its own chapel up to the 1830s when a new chapel was erected in Effin. A few years before its closure, up to 600 people were attending mass there every Sunday. It was a thatched chapel. There are no longer any remains. The last part of it standing was the sacristy and this remained up to and around 1910 when it was occupied by the local shoemaker, a man by the name of Casey. The boundary wall still remains and the entrance can be seen.

Wells
Lady's Well is in the townland of Ballyshanedehy in the parish of Effin. It is located about 600 metres north of the Ballyhea-Ardpatrick road. The well had ceased to be a place of pilgrimage by the early 1900s but continued to provide water for local people for domestic use up to the 1940s. It is lined in local stone and has recently been restored by the landowner on whose property it lies.

There is a well located in the townland of Ballymacshaneboy located about a mile and a half south of the Ballyhea-Ardpatrick road at the foot of the Ballyhoura mountains. This well was known as 'Tobar Rí an Domhnaigh', which means 'The well of the King of Sunday'. Nine smaller wells surround this well. This well is enclosed by an earthen bank of circular form believed to be in the shape of an eye. It was said that the bank was constructed by a local man when he regained his sight at the well. It is also believed that the well was stone-lined by a grateful father whose daughter's senses were restored after a fall from a horse, upon bathing her eyes and forehead with water from the well. A local man by the name of Tom Comber cleaned around the well in 1966 and erected a little shrine which contained statues, medals and rosary beads. The well is maintained and people still regularly visit it. But some well-meaning individuals erected a statue of the Blessed Virgin at this well in recent years. This has given rise to some confusion regarding the name of the well, with people now calling it Lady's Well, which is an entirely different well in the adjacent townland. There are no organized devotions there now, although it is still regarded as a holy well.

Toberacran ceased to be a pilgrimage site by 1840. Toberacran, in the townland of Gortnacrank, derived its name from Tobar a' Chrann, meaning "well of the tree".

Saint Bridgit's Well in Kilbreedy townland was no longer a pattern site in 1840. It was a small clear pool, roughly lined with stones. One large stone was set on edge beside the well. It was formerly very popular for its alleged power to cure sickness, especially sore eyes.

Danahar mentions a well in the parish, Toberreendoney, this is the anglicised version of 'Tobar Rí an Domhnaigh'. Danaher refers to two other wells in the parish, namely Tobernea and Toberbansha, but did not believe that they were holy wells.

Effin Creamery
Effin cheese is made in the local creamery. Many local farmers formerly brought their milk to the creamery.

Townlands

Garrienderk
Garrienderk or Garrynderk is a small townland and settlement on the R515 road near Charleville and the border with County Cork. It is beside Effin townland and within Effin parish. The townland contains a church dedicated to Saint Patrick.

Education
Scoil Mhuire National School is a co-educational primary school. The school opened in 1941. The current principal is Anne-Maria Murphy. In the 2016/2017 academic year the school had a staff of four teaches and 125 students.

Sport

There has been a club in existence in the parish since 1887. There is a GAA sports field with changing rooms and stand. In 2010, Effin hurling team won their first ever county-final, and went on to win a Munster title unfortunately they were defeated in the All-Ireland semi final by Na Fianna.  In 2011 they won Intermediate Hurling County Championship  and the Munster Title were a Senior Hurling Team for a couple of years.  They now play in the Intermediate League. In 2012 the club celebrated 125 years in existence.

A number of Effin hurlers have played for inter-county teams, including Nicky Quaid, Ned Rea, Conor O'Donovan and Tommy Quaid.

People
 John C. O'Riordan, a Catholic bishop of Kenema in Sierra Leone, was born here.
 Tim Hannan, using the pseudonym Rambling Thady, wrote a column for the Limerick Leader newspaper from 1933 until his death in 1948. He was a contributor to the Limerick Leader with his column, "Stray Scraps" from 1933 until his death in 1948, and a local school master, councillor, and public figure.
 Brother Stephen Russell, was born Jim Russell on Christmas Day 1911 in Thomastown, Effin,  Co Limerick. He was a war veteran, poet and after the war he joined the Alexian Order and in 1948 he helped establishment of the foundation of the Novitiate House Alexian Order in Cobh Co. Cork.  His first book of poems "'There but for the Grace of God'" was published in 1972 and Brother Russell donated the entire proceeds of its sale to the Simon Community Building fund. He returned to Ireland to manage  and supervise the Simon Community hostel at Charlotte Quay limerick. He died on 11 May 1975 and is buried with his fellow Brothers in Christ in the cemetery attached to Alexian Brothers in Warrenpoint Co Down On 29 November 2013 the sod was turned on the redevelopment of Brother Russell House

See also
List of towns and villages in Ireland

References

Towns and villages in County Limerick
Civil parishes of County Limerick